Yuen Long Tung Tau is one of the 39 constituencies in the Yuen Long District.

Created for the 2019 District Council elections, the constituency returns one district councillor to the Yuen Long District Council, with an election every four years.

Yuen Long Tung Tau loosely covers areas surrounding Tung Tau Industrial Area in Yuen Long. It has projected population of 13,186.

Councillors represented

Election results

2010s

References

Yuen Long
Constituencies of Hong Kong
Constituencies of Yuen Long District Council
2019 establishments in Hong Kong
Constituencies established in 2019